Iliella spinosa is an extinct species of kazacharthran branchiopod crustaceans from the Lower Jurassic of Kazakhstan. It had a unique carapace that was shaped like a spiny double-oval.

References

Branchiopoda genera
Prehistoric crustacean genera
Jurassic crustaceans
Fossils of Kazakhstan